The Red Baron is a 1972 animated one-hour TV-movie (with a live-action segment near the end) that was aired on December 9 as an episode of the anthology series The ABC Saturday Superstar Movie. This is one of the four entries that Rankin/Bass Productions was involved with, and one of the three that Topcraft collaborated with Rankin/Bass.

It has also aired internationally on Channel 5 in the United Kingdom.

Plot
This animated movie features The Red Baron who is cast as a heroic blubbery old Great Dane in a world set featuring anthropomorphic animals, mostly heroic dogs.

Prince Heinrich of Weinerburg (a Doberman) has fallen in love with Princess Sophie of Pretzelheim and have ran off together. But after listening to an emergency announcement on the radio that the Princess was reported to have been kidnapped as announced by the King and demanding that "all able-bodied men" to report at once to help rescue her, Baron von Richthofen otherwise known as The Red Baron comes out of retirement and decides to join the Flying Corps to take on the journey to rescue her. With the assistants of his inarticulate cat Putzi and wheezing dachshund assistant Schnitzel, he builds his own triplane and takes the job to fight, despite scorn from Captain Von Zipper and the other soldiers originally. But later gets supported by them after proving worthy of an officer.

Catahari is suspected to be involved in the scheme and is considered a prime suspect. But she later on does warm up to have loving feelings for the Baron. Meanwhile, after everything, the Baron does come back with the Princess. However, she felt very sad because she actually prefers to be with the Prince of Weinerburg as they show legit affection to one another. After the Kings of Pretzelheim and Weinerburg's ongoing rivalry for years, they finally put aside their differences and work things out by becoming in-laws. But then, Catahari ends up chasing after the Baron as she still wants to be with him.

Cast
 Bob McFadden
 Allen Swift
 Bradley Bolke as Schnitzel 
 Rhoda Mann as Princess Sophie of Pretzelheim and Catahari

Crew

 Executive Producer: Michael Webster
 Produced and Directed by Arthur Rankin, Jr. and Jules Bass  (Uncredited)
 Associate Producer: Mary Alice Dwyer
 Music: Maury Laws
 Editorial Supervision: Irwin Goldress and Vincent Juliano 
 Sound Engineers: John Curcio
 Production Supervisor: Gregory Knapp
 Character Designs: Paul Coker
 Animation Supervision: Toru Hara

Home video
This film was released on VHS in 1983 in the United Kingdom by Odyssey Video. And in 1985 in North America by Prism Entertainment in 1985 under the Children's Video Playground lineup.  It was also re-released on VHS in the UK by Channel 5 Home Video in 1986.

There is also a Swedish dub of the film that was also released on VHS by Din Video, released as Röde Baronen. 

However, among these home video releases, the synopsis for them falsely claim there are cat villains in the film with Putzi being the main villain that has kidnapped Princess Sophie, when it is actually Prince Heinrich that eloped with her. Putzi is actually the Red Baron's assistant.

Reception

References

External links

1972 animated films
1972 films
1972 television films
1972 television specials
1970s American animated films
1970s science fiction comedy films
1970s American television specials
1970s animated television specials
The ABC Saturday Superstar Movie
American science fiction comedy films
American fantasy films
Films scored by Maury Laws
Television shows directed by Jules Bass
Television shows directed by Arthur Rankin Jr.
Rankin/Bass Productions television specials
1972 comedy films
1970s English-language films